Denali is a mountain in Alaska, and the highest in North America.

Denali may also refer to:

Places
 Denali Borough, Alaska, in which the mountain and most of the park are located
 Denali Fault, intracontinental strike-slip fault
 Denali National Park and Preserve, within which Denali is located
 Denali Highway, Alaska State Highway 8
 Denali State Park, a state park near the national park

Art, entertainment, and media
 Denali (band), an American band
Denali (album), self-titled album by the eponymous American band
 Denali, the great Mastodon from the 1980s television series Gumby
 Denali (drag queen), a drag performer who appeared on season 13 of RuPaul's Drag Race

Computing
 Denali (operating system), computer software from University of Washington
 Denali Software, a semiconductor design and software company
 Denali, the internal codename for version 11.0 of Microsoft SQL Server

Transportation
 Denali (Alaska Railroad station), a station on the Denali Star rail line
 Denali - The Alaska Gas Pipeline, a proposed natural gas pipeline by BP and ConocoPhillips
 GMC Denali, the nameplate for some luxury versions of GMC trucks and SUVs
 ZB 304, or floating dock Denali, a barge in use at Dutch Harbor, Alaska
 Denali Scout, a two-seat STOL aeroplane by American Champion Aircraft
 Beechcraft Denali, a light aeroplane by Textron subsidiary Beechcraft

Other uses
 Denali Award (disambiguation), any of several awards
 Denali fleabane, a flower

See also